Nathalie Henseler (born 9 December 1975, Altdorf, Switzerland) is a Swiss entrepreneur, author and politician (non-party).

Life and career 
Nathalie Henseler grew up in Goldau. After finishing high school at Theresianum Ingenbohl, she studied German language and literature, geography and history at the University of Zurich.

She then worked for several years as a freelance journalist and editor at the daily newspaper Blick. After which, she then became self-employed as a political and strategy consultant.

In 2006 she voluntarily took over the presidency of the unused gondola lift on the Rotenfluh. 10 years later, after long political processes, the new gondola lift reopened in December 2014. Today Nathalie Henseler is CEO and chairman of the board of the Rotenfluebahn Mythenregion AG. She was voted "Head of the Year 2014" in the canton of Schwyz.

In 2022, Henseler's determination and achievement to keep the "Rotenfluebahn" alive were honoured as she was named as one of 50 Swiss women who have influence life in their region and beyond the Swiss borders.

Henseler is married, has three children and lives in Rickenbach near Schwyz.

Politics 
Nathalie Henseler was a member of the Executive Committee of the Constitutional Commission of the Canton of Schwyz. She is co-founder of the Schwyzer Kinderparlament. She ran for Council of States, the elections in 2015, in the canton of Schwyz.

Bibliography 
 Nathalie Henseler (2010), "Gipfelgeschichte: Wie die Schweizer Berge zu ihrem Namen kamen."

References

External links 
 Website of Nathalie Henseler
 Nathalie Henseler's political profile on Vimentis

21st-century Swiss businesspeople
1975 births
University of Zurich alumni
Living people